WUHU (107.1 FM) is a Top 40 (CHR)–formatted radio station licensed to Smiths Grove, Kentucky, United States, and serving the Bowling Green area of south central Kentucky. The station is currently owned by Forever Communications, Inc. as part of a conglomerate with Bowling Green–licensed oldies station WBGN (1340 AM), Glasgow–licensed country music station WLYE-FM (94.5 FM), and Auburn–licensed country station WBVR-FM (96.7 FM). All four stations share studios on Scottsville Road in southern Bowling Green, and its transmitter is located along Halifax-Bailey Road between Bowling Green and Scottsville. WUHU features programming from Compass Media Networks.

History
The station was assigned the call letters WBLG on November 1, 1985 when the FCC first issued the construction permit for the station. The station signed on the air 13 months later, on December 1, 1986. On May 4, 1987, the station was purchased by Hilltopper Broadcasting, which would end up also owning WBGN the following year.

In the station's first 14 years on the air, it played an Adult contemporary format. Hourly nation news updates were provided by NBC News Radio during that time period. During the 1990s, until March 2001, the station was branded as "Gator 107", and later "G-107."

On March 15, 2001, the station changed its call letters to the current WUHU. The current Top-40 format and "WUHU" branding were introduced on April 2, 2001, after a weekend stunt during the preceding weekend (March 31-April 1, 2001), in which the station played the same three songs (each of which featured the word "woo-hoo") repeatedly. Forever Communications acquired the station on December 31, 2002. 
As a Top 40-formatted station, WUHU often competes with WRVW of Lebanon, Tennessee for listener allegiances due to Bowling Green's 60-mile proximity to the Nashville area.

Programming 
Along with its music programming, the station is the local home of the American Top 40 and Weekend Top 30. Weather forecasts aired on the station are provided by NBC television affiliate WNKY.

References

External links
 

Contemporary hit radio stations in the United States
HD Radio stations
UHU
Radio stations established in 1985
Mass media in Bowling Green, Kentucky
1985 establishments in Kentucky